Luc Trudel is a Canadian politician. He was a Parti Québécois member of the National Assembly of Quebec for the riding of Saint-Maurice from 2012 to 2014, first elected in the 2012 election.

References

Living people
Parti Québécois MNAs
21st-century Canadian politicians
Year of birth missing (living people)